Bhimareddy Hanumareddy  Katarki (born 3 January 1924) is an Indian agricultural scientist specializing in cotton. During the 1970s, he was inspired by the success of Hybrid-4, Cotton  by Dr. C. T. Patel, of Surat Research Station. Dr. Katarki  also made a groundbreaking discovery of Varalaxmi, and DCH-32 Cotton varieties, at the Dharwad Agricultural University (Karnataka).

Childhood and Education 
Shri. Katarki  completed  B.Sc. (Agri.) 1945 Bombay); B.Sc. (Agri.) 1963 (IARI, New Delhi) and  D.Sc. (Karnataka, Dharwad) 1975.

Teacher and Researcher 
Served in various capacities:
 Department of Agriculture, (1954–1965)
 University of Agricultural Sciences, at Bangalore, and Dharwad from, 1965–1983.
 Post graduate teacher and Zonal Coordinator of South Zone from 1980 to 1983.
 member of ISCI, and R & D Sub-Committees, at Bombay, from 1980 to 1982.

Professional affiliations 
 Fellow of the Indian Society of Genetic and Plant Breeding.
 Member of Indian Society of Cotton Improvement.(ISCI )
 Member of Scientific Panel for Plant Breeding ICAR, New Delhi from 1979 to 1983.
 Member of Governing Board of Karnataka State Seed Certification Agency from 1981 to 1983.
 Member of the Central State Farm Advisory Committee,  in Karnataka,  from 1979 to 1981
 Life member  of Institute for Studies on Agriculture and Rural Development Dharwad, since 1982.

Achievements 
 Identified and released Extra long staple specific Tetra Ploid Cotton- Varalaxmi, in   the year 1972.
 DCH-32 in the year 1981, for Commercial Production in Southern and Central Cotton Belts of India- Capable of Spinning up to 80s and 90s counts.
 DS-56 and DS-59 (in G. hirsutum L), DB-3-12 (G.herbacium L), in the year 1982 for rain- fed fields.

Honours 
 In 1965 and 1984, The Gold medal from the Government of Karnataka.
 In 1972, Citation from the UAS, Bangalore.
 In 1974, Honour from The Karnataka State Farmers' Forum.
 In 1976, ICAR Gold medal.
 In 1976, National tonnage club of farmers.
 In 1976, The Indian Merchant Chambers Award.
 In 1977 Federation of Indian Chambers of Commerce and Industry.
 In 1981, Vasvik Industrial Research Award for outstanding achievements in the field of Agricultural Science and Technology.
 In 2007, ISCI, Mumbai's  Hon. Fellowship Award, in appreciation of his valuable contribution towards improving the Production and Quality of Interspecific Hybrid cottons in India.
 EICA, UAS Alumni Association Bangalore, Andhra Pradesh State level Seed Growers, Merchants and Nurserymen Association.
 In 2004, Lifetime achievement Award by UAS Dharwad, Karnataka State.

References

  Indian Society for Cotton Improvement Awards, June 16, 2007.
  Laxmivenkatesh, Holalkere Rangarao ; My Spin lab, 2005.

Textile scientists
1924 births
Living people